Kelly Benoit-Bird is a marine scientist and senior scientist at the Monterey Bay Aquarium Research Institute. Benoit-Bird uses acoustics to study marine organisms and was named a MacArthur Fellow in 2010.

Work and discoveries 
Benoit-Bird's research uses acoustical tools to study the interactions between predators and their prey in marine environments. Key linkages characterized in the lab's research include simultaneous tracking of predator-prey pairs such as northern fur seals and their prey juvenile pollock, spinner dolphins and micronekton, fish and zooplankton in thin layers in Monterey Bay, and beaked whales and squid. Benoit-Bird's research has also used acoustic measurements to examine how changes in the phase of the moon impact the migration of small marine organisms and the ability of predators such as spinner and dusky dolphins to find their prey. In research conducted off California, Brandon Southall and Benoit-Bird determined that beaked whales prefer to forage within a Navy test range due to the high density of prey available to the peaked whales in that region. Benoit-Bird has also developed instrumentation to make acoustic measurements with submersibles and autonomous vehicles.

Early life 
Benoit-Bird has been fascinated by the ocean since fourth grade, and is the first in her family to attend college.

Awards 

 2020: Medwin Prize in Acoustical Oceanography, Acoustical Society of America (ASA)
2017: Fellow, Acoustical Society of America
2007, 2013: Kavli Frontiers Fellowship, United States National Academy of Sciences
 2010: MacArthur Genius Award.
 2009: R. Bruce Lindsay Award, for contributions in marine ecological acoustics, Acoustical Society of America
 2008: Ocean Sciences Early Career Award, American Geophysical Union 
 2005: Presidential Early Career Award for Scientists and Engineers

References

External links

Living people
American marine biologists
Oregon State University faculty
1976 births
Brown University alumni
Place of birth missing (living people)
University of Hawaiʻi at Mānoa alumni
Fellows of the Acoustical Society of America
MacArthur Fellows